Joseph Roy may refer to:
 Joseph Roy (Lower Canada politician) (1771–1856), businessman and politician in Lower Canada
 Joseph-Edmond Roy (1858–1913), Quebec notary, editor and politician
 Joseph Alfred Ernest Roy (1871–1928), Quebec lawyer and member of the Canadian House of Commons
 Joseph Sasseville Roy (1895–?), Quebec businessman and member of the Canadian House of Commons
 Joseph-Aurélien Roy (1910–2001), Quebec businessman and member of the Canadian House of Commons and Quebec Assembly

 Joseph Roy (bishop) (1925–2004), bishop of the Roman Catholic Diocese of Mysore
Joseph Raymond Roy, former Canadian ambassador to Afghanistan